The Dubuque Ice Arena, formerly known as the Mystique Ice Center, is a 3,200 seat, single sheet ice rink and event space that serves the City of Dubuque and surrounding communities in Iowa, as well as nearby communities in Wisconsin and Illinois.

It is a top-loading facility with additional amenities including concessions on both the concourse and ground levels, luxury boxes on one side, three press boxes on the other, 8 restrooms, a lounge with full bar, conference room and lower level meeting room. Skates are available for rental for public skate sessions, there is a skate sharpener on site, and small skating accessories concession. Parking is available next to the building (125 spaces) and another 1500 spaces are across the street near the baseball fields. Additional parking is available at the Q Casino.

The arena is home to the 5-time Clark Cup Champion Dubuque Fighting Saints of the USHL. Owned by the City of Dubuque and operated by Q Casino, the facility is  Dubuque's first dedicated ice arena. The center plays host to youth and adult hockey, public skate, figure skating, and other ice activities. It is home to Dubuque Youth Hockey, the Dubuque Devils (High School Hockey), and the University of Wisconsin-Platteville Hockey Team (ACHA).

References

External links
Official website

Indoor arenas in Iowa
Indoor ice hockey venues in the United States
Sports venues in Iowa
2010 establishments in Iowa
Sports venues completed in 2010
College ice hockey venues in the United States
Buildings and structures in Dubuque, Iowa